Lucien Berthelot (November 6, 1903 – October 30, 1985) of France, was a philatelist who helped restore the administration of French philately after World War II.

Philatelic activity
Berthelot served the Fédération Internationale de Philatélie (FIP) as president and vice president during the period 1947 to 1972, helping the FIP to restore itself after the effects of World War II.  He also served as president of the Fédération Français and was a member of L'Academie de Philatélie.

Berthelot helped re-establish and organize national and international stamp exhibitions, and served on their rules committees and juries.

Honors and awards
Berthelot signed the Roll of Distinguished Philatelists in 1972 and was named to the American Philatelic Society Hall of Fame in 1986.

See also
 Philately
 Philatelic literature

References
 Lucien Berthelot

1903 births
1985 deaths
French philatelists
Signatories to the Roll of Distinguished Philatelists
American Philatelic Society